Angelos Piniotis (born 22 April 1996) is a Greek professional footballer who plays as a midfielder for Football League club Egaleo.

References

1996 births
Living people
Greek footballers
Greece under-21 international footballers
Greece youth international footballers
Super League Greece players
Football League (Greece) players
Gamma Ethniki players
Panionios F.C. players
Kallithea F.C. players
PAS Lamia 1964 players
Diagoras F.C. players
Panserraikos F.C. players
Association football midfielders
Footballers from Lamia (city)